The 1901 Pittsburgh Pirates finished in first place in the National League, 7½ games ahead of the second-place Philadelphia Phillies. It was the first year that the American League operated as a major league, but there would be no World Series between the leagues until 1903.

The team was managed by Fred Clarke, who was also their starting left fielder. Clarke, in his fifth year as a manager at age 28, won his first pennant. The Pirates won the National League championship in the next two years as well.

Regular season
The Pirates were led offensively by Honus Wagner, who led the league in RBI and stolen bases. Although the "Flying Dutchman" had never played shortstop in the majors until 1901, he appeared 61 times at shortstop that year in addition to spending time at third base and the outfield.

In a league that batted .267 as a whole, the Pirates outfield was notable for its hitting. Ginger Beaumont hit .332, player-manager Fred Clarke hit .324, and Lefty Davis hit .313.

The pitching staff of the Pirates allowed the fewest runs in the league and was among the greatest ever. The four top starting pitchers – Deacon Phillippe, Jack Chesbro, Jesse Tannehill, and Sam Leever – were the four top pitchers in the National League in terms of winning percentage. All of them were in the top ten in the league in ERA. Future Hall of Famer Rube Waddell had pitched well in 1900 for the Pirates, but was sold in May 1901 to the Chicago Orphans. With a record of 90-49, the Pirates had the best record in the league.

Season standings

Record vs. opponents

Game log

|- bgcolor="ccffcc"
| 1 || April 20 || @ Reds || 4–2 ||  ||  || — || — || 1–0
|- bgcolor="ffbbbb"
| 2 || April 23 || @ Cardinals || 4–10 ||  ||  || — || — || 1–1
|- bgcolor="ccffcc"
| 3 || April 24 || @ Cardinals || 5–4 ||  ||  || — || — || 2–1
|- bgcolor="ffbbbb"
| 4 || April 27 || Cardinals || 2–7 ||  ||  || — || — || 2–2
|- bgcolor="ccffcc"
| 5 || April 29 || Cardinals || 14–12 ||  ||  || — || — || 3–2
|- bgcolor="ffbbbb"
| 6 || April 30 || Cardinals || 2–4 ||  ||  || — || — || 3–3
|-

|- bgcolor="ffbbbb"
| 7 || May 1 || Orphans || 3–8 ||  ||  || — || — || 3–4
|- bgcolor="ccffcc"
| 8 || May 2 || Orphans || 3–2 ||  ||  || — || — || 4–4
|- bgcolor="ccffcc"
| 9 || May 3 || Orphans || 10–6 ||  ||  || — || — || 5–4
|- bgcolor="ffbbbb"
| 10 || May 4 || Orphans || 2–4 ||  ||  || — || — || 5–5
|- bgcolor="ccffcc"
| 11 || May 5 || @ Orphans || 4–2 ||  ||  || — || — || 6–5
|- bgcolor="ccffcc"
| 12 || May 7 || @ Orphans || 8–0 ||  ||  || — || — || 7–5
|- bgcolor="ccffcc"
| 13 || May 8 || @ Orphans || 8–7 ||  ||  || — || — || 8–5
|- bgcolor="ccffcc"
| 14 || May 9 || @ Orphans || 8–1 ||  ||  || — || — || 9–5
|- bgcolor="ccffcc"
| 15 || May 10 || Reds || 3–0 ||  ||  || — || — || 10–5
|- bgcolor="ffbbbb"
| 16 || May 12 || @ Reds || 1–6 ||  ||  || — || — || 10–6
|- bgcolor="ffbbbb"
| 17 || May 13 || Reds || 2–3 ||  ||  || — || — || 10–7
|- bgcolor="ccffcc"
| 18 || May 14 || @ Phillies || 3–2 ||  ||  || — || — || 11–7
|- bgcolor="ffbbbb"
| 19 || May 15 || @ Phillies || 5–6 ||  ||  || — || — || 11–8
|- bgcolor="ffbbbb"
| 20 || May 16 || @ Phillies || 2–12 ||  ||  || — || — || 11–9
|- bgcolor="ccffcc"
| 21 || May 17 || @ Phillies || 6–4 ||  ||  || — || — || 12–9
|- bgcolor="ffbbbb"
| 22 || May 21 || @ Giants || 1–2 ||  ||  || — || — || 12–10
|- bgcolor="ffbbbb"
| 23 || May 22 || @ Giants || 1–2 ||  ||  || — || — || 12–11
|- bgcolor="ffbbbb"
| 24 || May 23 || @ Beaneaters || 3–7 ||  ||  || — || — || 12–12
|- bgcolor="ccffcc"
| 25 || May 24 || @ Beaneaters || 6–4 ||  ||  || — || — || 13–12
|- bgcolor="ccffcc"
| 26 || May 25 || @ Beaneaters || 11–1 ||  ||  || — || — || 14–12
|- bgcolor="ffbbbb"
| 27 || May 28 || @ Superbas || 7–8 ||  ||  || — || — || 14–13
|- bgcolor="ccffcc"
| 28 || May 30 || @ Superbas || 4–3 ||  ||  || — || 2,300 || 15–13
|- bgcolor="ffbbbb"
| 29 || May 30 || @ Superbas || 2–8 ||  ||  || — || 11,000 || 15–14
|- bgcolor="ccffcc"
| 30 || May 31 || @ Superbas || 5–2 ||  ||  || — || — || 16–14
|-

|- bgcolor="ffbbbb"
| 31 || June 1 || Reds || 3–4 ||  ||  || — || — || 16–15
|- bgcolor="ccffcc"
| 32 || June 2 || @ Orphans || 6–1 ||  ||  || — || — || 17–15
|- bgcolor="ccffcc"
| 33 || June 3 || Phillies || 11–1 ||  ||  || — || — || 18–15
|- bgcolor="ccffcc"
| 34 || June 4 || Phillies || 4–3 ||  ||  || — || — || 19–15
|- bgcolor="ccffcc"
| 35 || June 5 || Phillies || 5–2 ||  ||  || — || — || 20–15
|- bgcolor="ffbbbb"
| 36 || June 6 || Superbas || 1–4 ||  ||  || — || — || 20–16
|- bgcolor="ccffcc"
| 37 || June 7 || Superbas || 5–4 ||  ||  || — || — || 21–16
|- bgcolor="ffbbbb"
| 38 || June 8 || Superbas || 3–7 ||  ||  || — || — || 21–17
|- bgcolor="ccffcc"
| 39 || June 10 || Giants || 3–1 ||  ||  || — || — || 22–17
|- bgcolor="ccffcc"
| 40 || June 11 || Giants || 4–0 ||  ||  || — || — || 23–17
|- bgcolor="ccffcc"
| 41 || June 12 || Giants || 5–2 ||  ||  || — || — || 24–17
|- bgcolor="ccffcc"
| 42 || June 13 || Beaneaters || 6–2 ||  ||  || — || — || 25–17
|- bgcolor="ffbbbb"
| 43 || June 14 || Beaneaters || 1–7 ||  ||  || — || — || 25–18
|- bgcolor="ccffcc"
| 44 || June 15 || Beaneaters || 1–0 ||  ||  || — || — || 26–18
|- bgcolor="ccffcc"
| 45 || June 16 || @ Reds || 2–0 ||  ||  || — || — || 27–18
|- bgcolor="ccffcc"
| 46 || June 18 || Cardinals || 9–2 ||  ||  || — || — || 28–18
|- bgcolor="ffffff"
| 47 || June 19 || @ Giants || 5–5 ||  ||  || — || — || 28–18
|- bgcolor="ccffcc"
| 48 || June 20 || @ Giants || 7–0 ||  ||  || — || — || 29–18
|- bgcolor="ffbbbb"
| 49 || June 21 || @ Giants || 2–3 ||  ||  || — || — || 29–19
|- bgcolor="ffbbbb"
| 50 || June 22 || @ Beaneaters || 2–4 ||  ||  || — || — || 29–20
|- bgcolor="ccffcc"
| 51 || June 22 || @ Beaneaters || 6–2 ||  ||  || — || — || 30–20
|- bgcolor="ccffcc"
| 52 || June 24 || @ Beaneaters || 8–2 ||  ||  || — || — || 31–20
|- bgcolor="ffbbbb"
| 53 || June 25 || @ Beaneaters || 4–9 ||  ||  || — || — || 31–21
|- bgcolor="ffbbbb"
| 54 || June 26 || @ Superbas || 3–16 ||  ||  || — || — || 31–22
|- bgcolor="ffbbbb"
| 55 || June 27 || @ Superbas || 7–8 ||  ||  || — || — || 31–23
|- bgcolor="ccffcc"
| 56 || June 28 || @ Superbas || 5–3 ||  ||  || — || — || 32–23
|- bgcolor="ccffcc"
| 57 || June 29 || @ Phillies || 5–4 ||  ||  || — || — || 33–23
|-

|- bgcolor="ffbbbb"
| 58 || July 1 || @ Phillies || 0–1 ||  ||  || — || — || 33–24
|- bgcolor="ccffcc"
| 59 || July 2 || @ Phillies || 5–3 ||  ||  || — || — || 34–24
|- bgcolor="ffbbbb"
| 60 || July 4 || Giants || 3–5 ||  ||  || — || — || 34–25
|- bgcolor="ccffcc"
| 61 || July 4 || Giants || 12–0 ||  ||  || — || — || 35–25
|- bgcolor="ccffcc"
| 62 || July 5 || Giants || 7–2 ||  ||  || — || — || 36–25
|- bgcolor="ccffcc"
| 63 || July 6 || Giants || 6–2 ||  ||  || — || — || 37–25
|- bgcolor="ccffcc"
| 64 || July 8 || Beaneaters || 5–0 ||  ||  || — || — || 38–25
|- bgcolor="ccffcc"
| 65 || July 9 || Beaneaters || 9–4 ||  ||  || — || — || 39–25
|- bgcolor="ccffcc"
| 66 || July 10 || Beaneaters || 1–0 ||  ||  || — || — || 40–25
|- bgcolor="ccffcc"
| 67 || July 11 || Beaneaters || 5–0 ||  ||  || — || — || 41–25
|- bgcolor="ffbbbb"
| 68 || July 12 || Phillies || 2–4 ||  ||  || — || — || 41–26
|- bgcolor="ccffcc"
| 69 || July 13 || Phillies || 5–3 ||  ||  || — || — || 42–26
|- bgcolor="ccffcc"
| 70 || July 14 || @ Orphans || 3–1 ||  ||  || — || — || 43–26
|- bgcolor="ffbbbb"
| 71 || July 16 || Phillies || 3–6 ||  ||  || — || — || 43–27
|- bgcolor="ffbbbb"
| 72 || July 17 || Superbas || 3–7 ||  ||  || — || — || 43–28
|- bgcolor="ffbbbb"
| 73 || July 18 || Superbas || 3–4 ||  ||  || — || — || 43–29
|- bgcolor="ffbbbb"
| 74 || July 19 || Superbas || 4–5 ||  ||  || — || — || 43–30
|- bgcolor="ccffcc"
| 75 || July 20 || Superbas || 15–2 ||  ||  || — || — || 44–30
|- bgcolor="ccffcc"
| 76 || July 23 || Reds || 9–2 ||  ||  || — || — || 45–30
|- bgcolor="ccffcc"
| 77 || July 24 || Reds || 11–2 ||  ||  || — || — || 46–30
|- bgcolor="ccffcc"
| 78 || July 25 || Reds || 9–5 ||  ||  || — || — || 47–30
|- bgcolor="ffbbbb"
| 79 || July 26 || @ Cardinals || 7–12 ||  ||  || — || — || 47–31
|- bgcolor="ccffcc"
| 80 || July 27 || @ Cardinals || 7–4 ||  ||  || — || — || 48–31
|- bgcolor="ffbbbb"
| 81 || July 28 || @ Cardinals || 3–5 ||  ||  || — || — || 48–32
|- bgcolor="ccffcc"
| 82 || July 29 || @ Cardinals || 8–0 ||  ||  || — || — || 49–32
|-

|- bgcolor="ffbbbb"
| 83 || August 3 || Reds || 4–7 ||  ||  || — || — || 49–33
|- bgcolor="ccffcc"
| 84 || August 4 || @ Reds || 6–3 ||  ||  || — || — || 50–33
|- bgcolor="ffbbbb"
| 85 || August 5 || Cardinals || 6–20 ||  ||  || — || — || 50–34
|- bgcolor="ccffcc"
| 86 || August 6 || Cardinals || 8–1 ||  ||  || — || — || 51–34
|- bgcolor="ccffcc"
| 87 || August 7 || Cardinals || 9–3 ||  ||  || — || — || 52–34
|- bgcolor="ccffcc"
| 88 || August 8 || Orphans || 7–6 ||  ||  || — || — || 53–34
|- bgcolor="ffbbbb"
| 89 || August 9 || Orphans || 1–4 ||  ||  || — || — || 53–35
|- bgcolor="ccffcc"
| 90 || August 11 || @ Orphans || 5–1 ||  ||  || — || — || 54–35
|- bgcolor="ccffcc"
| 91 || August 17 || Reds || 5–0 ||  ||  || — || — || 55–35
|- bgcolor="ffbbbb"
| 92 || August 18 || @ Reds || 4–5 ||  ||  || — || — || 55–36
|- bgcolor="ccffcc"
| 93 || August 19 || @ Cardinals || 9–5 ||  ||  || — || — || 56–36
|- bgcolor="ccffcc"
| 94 || August 20 || @ Cardinals || 14–2 ||  ||  || — || — || 57–36
|- bgcolor="ffbbbb"
| 95 || August 21 || @ Cardinals || 3–4 ||  ||  || — || — || 57–37
|- bgcolor="ccffcc"
| 96 || August 22 || @ Cardinals || 4–3 ||  ||  || — || — || 58–37
|- bgcolor="ccffcc"
| 97 || August 25 || @ Reds || 6–3 ||  ||  || — || — || 59–37
|- bgcolor="ffbbbb"
| 98 || August 26 || Cardinals || 2–5 ||  ||  || — || — || 59–38
|- bgcolor="ccffcc"
| 99 || August 27 || Cardinals || 7–1 ||  ||  || — || — || 60–38
|- bgcolor="ffbbbb"
| 100 || August 28 || Cardinals || 7–9 ||  ||  || — || — || 60–39
|- bgcolor="ffbbbb"
| 101 || August 29 || Orphans || 1–4 ||  ||  || — || — || 60–40
|- bgcolor="ccffcc"
| 102 || August 29 || Orphans || 2–1 ||  ||  || — || — || 61–40
|- bgcolor="ffbbbb"
| 103 || August 31 || Orphans || 1–5 ||  ||  || — || — || 61–41
|- bgcolor="ccffcc"
| 104 || August 31 || Orphans || 5–2 ||  ||  || — || — || 62–41
|-

|- bgcolor="ccffcc"
| 105 || September 2 || @ Beaneaters || 5–3 ||  ||  || — || — || 63–41
|- bgcolor="ccffcc"
| 106 || September 2 || @ Beaneaters || 3–0 ||  ||  || — || — || 64–41
|- bgcolor="ccffcc"
| 107 || September 3 || @ Beaneaters || 5–2 ||  ||  || — || — || 65–41
|- bgcolor="ccffcc"
| 108 || September 4 || @ Giants || 12–6 ||  ||  || — || — || 66–41
|- bgcolor="ccffcc"
| 109 || September 4 || @ Giants || 10–3 ||  ||  || — || — || 67–41
|- bgcolor="ccffcc"
| 110 || September 5 || @ Giants || 15–1 ||  ||  || — || — || 68–41
|- bgcolor="ccffcc"
| 111 || September 5 || @ Giants || 15–7 ||  ||  || — || — || 69–41
|- bgcolor="ccffcc"
| 112 || September 6 || @ Giants || 15–2 ||  ||  || — || — || 70–41
|- bgcolor="ccffcc"
| 113 || September 6 || @ Giants || 13–4 ||  ||  || — || — || 71–41
|- bgcolor="ffbbbb"
| 114 || September 7 || @ Phillies || 1–4 ||  ||  || — || — || 71–42
|- bgcolor="ccffcc"
| 115 || September 9 || @ Phillies || 11–5 ||  ||  || — || — || 72–42
|- bgcolor="ccffcc"
| 116 || September 10 || @ Phillies || 8–5 ||  ||  || — || — || 73–42
|- bgcolor="ccffcc"
| 117 || September 11 || @ Superbas || 5–4 ||  ||  || — || — || 74–42
|- bgcolor="ffbbbb"
| 118 || September 13 || @ Superbas || 3–5 ||  ||  || — || — || 74–43
|- bgcolor="ffbbbb"
| 119 || September 13 || @ Superbas || 2–4 ||  ||  || — || — || 74–44
|- bgcolor="ccffcc"
| 120 || September 14 || Reds || 5–3 ||  ||  || — || — || 75–44
|- bgcolor="ccffcc"
| 121 || September 14 || Reds || 8–4 ||  ||  || — || — || 76–44
|- bgcolor="ccffcc"
| 122 || September 15 || @ Reds || 3–0 ||  ||  || — || — || 77–44
|- bgcolor="ccffcc"
| 123 || September 17 || @ Reds || 7–2 ||  ||  || — || — || 78–44
|- bgcolor="ccffcc"
| 124 || September 18 || Phillies || 5–1 ||  ||  || — || — || 79–44
|- bgcolor="ccffcc"
| 125 || September 20 || Phillies || 10–1 ||  ||  || — || — || 80–44
|- bgcolor="ccffcc"
| 126 || September 20 || Phillies || 7–2 ||  ||  || — || — || 81–44
|- bgcolor="ffbbbb"
| 127 || September 21 || Phillies || 2–4 ||  ||  || — || — || 81–45
|- bgcolor="ccffcc"
| 128 || September 22 || @ Orphans || 15–9 ||  ||  || — || — || 82–45
|- bgcolor="ccffcc"
| 129 || September 23 || Giants || 5–4 ||  ||  || — || — || 83–45
|- bgcolor="ccffcc"
| 130 || September 24 || Giants || 14–9 ||  ||  || — || — || 84–45
|- bgcolor="ccffcc"
| 131 || September 25 || Giants || 10–5 ||  ||  || — || — || 85–45
|- bgcolor="ccffcc"
| 132 || September 26 || Superbas || 4–3 ||  ||  || — || — || 86–45
|- bgcolor="ccffcc"
| 133 || September 27 || Superbas || 5–4 ||  ||  || — || — || 87–45
|- bgcolor="ffbbbb"
| 134 || September 29 || @ Reds || 1–2 ||  ||  || — || — || 87–46
|- bgcolor="ffbbbb"
| 135 || September 29 || @ Reds || 1–2 ||  ||  || — || — || 87–47
|- bgcolor="ffbbbb"
| 136 || September 30 || Beaneaters || 1–5 ||  ||  || — || — || 87–48
|-

|- bgcolor="ccffcc"
| 137 || October 1 || Beaneaters || 9–0 ||  ||  || — || — || 88–48
|- bgcolor="ccffcc"
| 138 || October 2 || Beaneaters || 8–4 ||  ||  || — || — || 89–48
|- bgcolor="ffbbbb"
| 139 || October 5 || @ Orphans || 1–2 ||  ||  || — || — || 89–49
|- bgcolor="ccffcc"
| 140 || October 6 || @ Orphans || 9–5 ||  ||  || — || — || 90–49
|-

|-
| Legend:       = Win       = Loss       = TieBold = Pittsburgh Pirates team member

Detailed records

Opening Day lineup
Chief Zimmer – C
Kitty Bransfield – 1B
Claude Ritchey – 2B
Tommy Leach – 3B
Bones Ely – SS
Fred Clarke – LF
Ginger Beaumont – CF
Lefty Davis – RF

Roster

Awards and honors
Ginger Beaumont
 #3 in NL in runs scored (120)

Deacon Phillippe
 #2 in NL in ERA (2.22)
 #3 in NL in wins (22)

Jesse Tannehill
 NL leader in ERA (2.18)

Honus Wagner
 NL leader in RBI (126)
 NL leader in stolen bases (49)
 #4 in NL in batting average (.353)
 #4 in NL in on-base percentage (.417)

Statistics

Batting

Starters by position
Note: Pos = Position; G = Games played; AB = At bats; H = Hits; Avg. = Batting average; HR = Home runs; RBI = Runs batted in

Other batters
Note: G = Games played; AB = At bats; H = Hits; Avg. = Batting average; HR = Home runs; RBI = Runs batted in

Pitching

Starting pitchers
Note: G = Games pitched; IP = Innings pitched; W = Wins; L = Losses; ERA = Earned run average; SO = Strikeouts

Other pitchers
Note: G = Games pitched; IP = Innings pitched; W = Wins; L = Losses; ERA = Earned run average; SO = Strikeouts

Transactions
 June 27, 1901: Snake Wiltse was released by the Pirates.

Notes

References

External links
 1901 Pittsburgh Pirates team page at Baseball Reference
 1901 Pittsburgh Pirates Page at Baseball Almanac

Pittsburgh Pirates seasons
Pittsburgh Pirates season
National League champion seasons
Pittsburg Pir